The 1903–04 season was Madrid Football Club's 2nd season in existence. The club played some friendly matches against local clubs. Madrid FC also played their second-ever match outside of the Community of Madrid against Athletic Bilbao in Bilbao.

They also played in the Campeonato de Madrid (Madrid Championship) and the Copa del Rey. Madrid FC merged with Moderno Football Club on 30 January 1904 and contested these championships under the name Madrid–Moderno.

Summary
Some of Madrid FC's best players left to join the newly formed Athletic Club Sucursal de Madrid (now Atlético Madrid) during the season. This precipitated a merger with Moderno FC on 30 January 1904 in order to survive. Carlos Padrós was elected president post-merger.

Friendlies

Competitions

Overview

Copa del Rey

The 1904 Copa del Rey was organized by the newly formed Madrid Football Federation. Originally, three teams were to participate, and the Federation invited Athletic Bilbao representing Biscay and Espanyol representing Catalonia. Madrid was to be represented by the winner of a preliminary round between Club Español de Madrid and Madrid-Moderno (a merger of Madrid CF and Moderno FC). The three teams were to contest the cup in a round-robin format. Before the tournament, Espanyol, unhappy with the competition system, announced they would not go to Madrid. Then two more teams from Madrid, Moncloa FC and Iberia Football Club, were admitted in the competition, forcing a change to the schedule. As a result, the four Madrid teams were scheduled to play a single-elimination tournament to decide their representative for the Copa del Rey final against automatically qualified Athletic Bilbao.

The semi-final qualifying match between Club Español de Madrid and Madrid-Moderno ended in 5–5 draw. The captains of both teams agreed not to play extra time, but failed to reach an agreement on when they should replay the match. Español wanted to play the next day, but Madrid-Moderno refused, citing the rules of the tournament which stated that a replay could not be played less than 48 hours after the previous game. The next day Club Español went to replay the match, but Madrid-Moderno did not appear. The regional federation, whose president Ceferino Birdalone happened to be president of Club Español as well, ruled in favor of Español, and they were declared winners of the match eliminating Madrid FC from the competition.

Notes

References

External links
Realmadrid.com Official Site

Real Madrid
Real Madrid CF seasons